Pedro Adriano Veloso Gusmão, also known as Pedro Gusmao is a Brazilian footballer who currently plays for Moto Clube.

Teams

Pedro saw many transfers in his career.

Bacabal
Pedro played on his hometown's team called  Bacabal Esporte Clube. He did many goals and, for a little time, was the player who did more goals on Brazil.

Ypiranga
Pedro has made his first senior career appearance for Ypiranga Futebol Clube. This was the team for which he scored his first goal against Petrolina SFC.

Atletico-PR
Pedro had played only one match for Atlético Paranaense.

Kerala Blasters
He was drafted by Kerala Blasters in Indian Super League to play in the inaugural season of it. In only his 4th match for Kerala Blasters against Atlético de Kolkata, he not only scored one goal but also assisted one goal, which made him receive the 'Hero of the Match' award.

References

1992 births
Living people
Club Athletico Paranaense players
Kerala Blasters FC players
Kerala Blasters FC draft picks
Association football forwards
Brazilian footballers
Sportspeople from Maranhão